The Romanian Air Force 57th Air Base "Mihail Kogălniceanu" is an air base located near Constanța, at the Mihail Kogălniceanu International Airport. It is currently home to the 572nd Helicopter Squadron and also hosts the 861st Fighter Squadron of the 86th Air Base. The current base commander is Comandor Nicolae Crețu, succeeding Comandor Adrian Popescu.

History

Cold War era

It was equipped with Po-2, Yak-11, Yak-23 and Yak-17 aircraft.

The fighter regiment moved to the Mihail Kogălniceanu Aerodrome in 1955, following the escape by seaplane of two aviators from  Palazu Mare. The name was kept until 1995.

From 1979, the first MiG-23s arrived at the base. These equipped the 1st Squadron of the Regiment. The 2nd Squadron converted to the MiG-23 in 1980. From 1989, the Regiment started receiving MiG-29s. The MiG-29s were assigned to the 2nd and 3rd Squadrons of the Regiment.

Post-1990

The United States Armed Forces started to use the base in 1999. In 2003, it became one of four Romanian military facilities that U.S. military forces have used as a staging area for the invasion of, and ongoing counter-insurgency efforts in Iraq, operated by the 458th Air Expeditionary Group. It was intended to become one of the main operating bases of United States Army Europe's Joint Task Force East (JTF-E), a rotating task force initially to be provided by the U.S. 2nd Cavalry Regiment, which was to eventually grow to a brigade-sized force. The JTF-E concept has been reduced to the Army-only Task Force East, but the base still retains an important role, given added weight by the 2014 Crimean crisis.

During the first three months of the 2003 invasion of Iraq, the airport was transited by 1,300 cargo and personnel transports towards Iraq, comprising 6,200 personnel and about 11,100 tons of equipment. Since 2009, the United States has operated a Permanent Forward Operating Site (PFOS).

The base was disbanded in April 2004, following the retirement of the MiG-29s, becoming an annex to the 86th Air Base. All the MiG-29s remain in open storage at the base.

On 1 May 2007, the Mihail Kogălniceanu aerodrome was established with the mission to coordinate the aeronautical activities in the area of ​​responsibility, to ensure the Support of the Host Nation for the armed forces in transit, and to represent the interface between the foreign armed forces that carried out activities on the aerodrome and the public authorities represented locally. On 1 January 2014, Mihail Kogălniceanu Aerodrome changed its organizational structure, by assimilating the Mihail Kogălniceanu Administrative Center, subordinated to the General Staff of the Land Forces.

With the closure of the Transit Center at Manas in Kyrgyzstan, The United States military transferred processing operations for military deploying to Afghanistan and other locations to the base.  The United States Army 21st Theater Sustainment Command and Air Force 780th Expeditionary Airlift Squadron are responsible for US operations there.

On 15 August 2018, the Britain's Royal Air Force four Eurofighter Typhoons based there were scrambled to intercept six Russian Air Force Su-24 Fencer bombers over the Black Sea, under the NATO Enhanced Air Policing (eAP) mission.

In October 2019, a detachment of 4 IAR 330L helicopters from the 572nd Helicopter Squadron was sent to participate in the UN mission to Mali. The Carpathian Pumas detachment carried out medical evacuation missions, transport of troops and materials, air patrols, and observation missions. The detachment completed 380 missions until 2020. During the deployment, one helicopter was damaged by a storm while refueling at the UN base in Douentza.

On 5 September 2020, the Royal Canadian Air Force began a three-month NATO enhanced Air Policing mission with six CF-18 Hornet fighter jets that had deployed to Mihail Kogălniceanu. As of August 2022 the RCAF has returned with its fighters to continue the missions.

Foreign Deployments

NATO Enhanced Air Policing

NATO Enhanced Air Policing started in 2014, as NATO's response to Russia's annexation of Crimea. Since then several NATO members have been deployed on the base to participate in this mission:
The Royal Canadian Air Force, participated in the mission with CF-18 Hornet fighters since 2017.
The Royal Air Force, has participated with its Typhoons in the mission since 2017.
The Italian Air Force started its deployments in the mission since 2019.
The Spanish Air Force Eurofighter Typhoons began participating in the mission since 2021.

Other deployments

The United States Marine Corps Black Sea Rotational Force was headquartered at the base from 2010 until 2018, when the Corps was moved to Norway. In 2016, two F-22 Raptors arrived at the base as part of a Rapid Response program training exercise. After a few hours at the base, the F-22s flew back to Great Britain.

As of 2022, an ARTEMIS special mission aircraft of the United States Army deployed here for reconnaissance of Eastern Europe. Since February 2023, an Italian Air Force G550 CAEW is also deployed at the base.

In June 2022, elements of the 101st Airborne Division were deployed at the base. On 30 July 2022, they uncased their colors and conducted an air assault demonstration together with the Romanian 9th Mechanized Brigade. As of October, about 4,700 soldiers from Fort Campbell have been deployed on NATO's eastern flank, 2,400 of which are stationed at the Mihail Kogălniceanu base.

Future expansion
In 2021, the first stage of a 2 billion euro project was launched by the Romanian Armed Forces with the goal of modernizing and expanding the base as a response to the 2014 Russian annexation of Crimea.

On 10 June 2022, the Ministry of Defence announced the winners of the contract for the base upgrades. Three companies, along with 22 subcontractors, will take part in the works. The state secret-level classified project is set to finish in almost 9 years.

Alleged CIA black site
It was alleged to be one of the black sites involved in the CIA's network of "extraordinary renditions". According to Eurocontrol data, it has been the site of four landings and two stopovers by aircraft identified as probably belonging to the CIA's fleet of rendition planes, including at least one widely used executive jet N379P (later registered, and more commonly cited, as N44982).  

European, but not U.S., media have widely distributed reports of a fax intercepted by Swiss intelligence, datelined November 10, 2005, that "was sent by the Egyptian foreign minister, Ahmed Aboul Gheit, in Cairo, to his ambassador in London. It revealed that the United States had detained at least 23 Iraqi and Afghan captives at a military base called Mihail Kogălniceanu in Romania, and added that similar secret prisons were also to be found in Poland, Ukraine, Kosovo, Macedonia, and Bulgaria."

See also
99th Military Base Deveselu
Ramstein Air Base
Aviano Air Base
List of United States military bases

References

External links
  Order of Battle of the RoAF

57
Buildings and structures in Constanța County
1955 establishments in Romania